Pitzman Glacier is a glacier, 6 nautical miles (11 km) long, draining the southeast slopes of Pomerantz Tableland in the Usarp Mountains. It flows between Mount Lowman and Williams Bluff to an ice piedmont just eastward. Mapped by United States Geological Survey (USGS) from surveys and U.S. Navy air photos, 1960–62. Named by Advisory Committee on Antarctic Names (US-ACAN) for Frederick J. Pitzman, United States Antarctic Research Program (USARP) biologist at McMurdo Station, 1967–68.

Glaciers of Pennell Coast